Peter Francis Ryan  (13 September 1936 – 12 August 2021) was an Australian rules footballer who played with South Melbourne in the Victorian Football League (VFL).

Ryan was also a policeman, reaching the rank of Chief Superintendent, and was heavily involved in the Victoria Police Legacy organisation to assist the families of police who have died, similar to service that  Legacy Australia provides to members of the armed forces.

For more than 18 years he volunteered to coach the Sacred Heart Mission football and cricket teams.

References

External links 

1936 births
2021 deaths
Australian rules footballers from Victoria (Australia)
Sydney Swans players
Australian police officers